Stefan Florian Garczyński (13 October 1805 or 1806 – 20 September 1833) was a Polish patriot and Romantic poet, a passionate Messianist.

During November Uprising he served in Poznań's Riding Regiment. His report about explosion in Fort 54  during storm of Warsaw by Russian Army on 6 September 1831 inspired Adam Mickiewicz to write a poem Reduta Ordona (opowiadanie adiutanta) (Ordon's Redoubt - the story of an adjutant) (1832).

References

External links 

 

1805 births
1833 deaths
Polish poets
Romantic poets
19th-century poets